Nuclear transcription factor Y subunit beta is a protein that in humans is encoded by the NFYB gene.

Function 

The protein encoded by this gene is one subunit of a trimeric complex, forming a highly conserved transcription factor that binds with high specificity to CCAAT motifs in the promoter regions in a variety of genes. This gene product, subunit B, forms a tight dimer with the C subunit, a prerequisite for subunit A association. The resulting trimer binds to DNA with high specificity and affinity. Subunits B and C each contain a histone-like motif. Observation of the histone nature of these subunits is supported by two types of evidence; protein sequence alignments and experiments with mutants.

Interactions 

NFYB has been shown to interact with:
 CEBPZ, 
 CNTN2, 
 Myc, and
 TBP

References

Further reading

External links 
 
 

Transcription factors